Mount Goode, pronounced like "good", is a prominent  glaciated mountain summit located in the Chugach Mountains, in the U.S. state of Alaska.

History

This mountain is called Skitnu Dghelaya, meaning Brush River Mountain, in the Denaʼina language. The Mount Goode name was officially adopted March 5, 1924, by the U.S. Board on Geographic Names to commemorate Richard Urquhart Goode (1858-1903), geographer for the United States Geological Survey, in charge of the Pacific Division, Topographic Branch, at the time when work in the Alaska area was first conducted. The first ascent of the peak was made in April 1966 by John Vincent Hoeman and Helmut Tschaffert.

Climate

Based on the Köppen climate classification, Mount Goode is located in a subarctic climate zone with long, cold, snowy winters, and cool summers. Winter temperatures can drop below −20 °C with wind chill factors below −30 °C. This climate supports the Knik Glacier which surrounds the mountain. The months May through June offer the most favorable weather for climbing.

See also

List of mountain peaks of Alaska
Geography of Alaska

References

External links
 Weather forecast: Mount Goode
 Mountain Forecast

Goode
Goode
Goode
Denaʼina